Bo Hatchett is an American politician from Cornelia, Georgia. He graduated from the Georgia Institute of Technology in 2013 with a Bachelor of Science in biology. He then received a Juris Doctor from the University of Georgia School of Law in 2017. Hatchett is a Republican member of the Georgia State Senate for District 50.

References

Republican Party Georgia (U.S. state) state senators
21st-century American politicians
Georgia Tech alumni
Living people
Year of birth missing (living people)